Acetyl nitrate is the organic compound with the formula CH3C(O)ONO2.  It is classified as the mixed anhydride of nitric and acetic acids. It is a colorless explosive liquid that fumes in moist air.

Synthesis and reactions
It is prepared from acetic anhydride and dinitrogen pentoxide or with nitric acid:
(CH3CO)2O  +  HNO3   →  CH3C(O)ONO2  +  CH3COOH
It hydrolyzes in moist air to acetic acid and nitric acid. Alternatively, nitric acid adds to ketene.

It is used for some nitrations and nitrolysis reactions. It acetylates amines, akin to the behavior of acetyl chloride:
2NH3 + CH3C(O)ONO2 -> NH4NO3 + CH3CONH2

References

Explosive chemicals
Nitrates
Acid anhydrides
Liquid explosives